Elena M. Sliepcevich (July 29, 1919 - March 3, 2008) was one of the leading figures in the development of health education as an academic discipline and profession.

Biography
A 1939 graduate of the University of Idaho, Sliepcevich received her master's degree from the University of Michigan in 1949 and her doctorate in physical education from Springfield College in 1955. She was a professor of health education at the Ohio State University in 1961, when she was selected to direct the School Health Education Study (1961–1969). Most health education curricula developed since have been based on the 10 conceptual areas identified by the School Health Education Study: community health, consumer health, environmental health, family life, mental and emotional health, injury prevention and safety, nutrition, personal health, prevention and control of disease, and drug use and abuse. The Study's model curriculum became known as the School Health Curriculum Project  (later renamed Growing Healthy)

The Study's findings were also the major reason for President Nixon’s creation of the President's Committee on Health Education in 1971. When the National Center for Health Education (NCHE) was created in 1975 as a result of one of the recommendation of the committee, Dr. Sliepcevich was one of the center's founders. She was one of the principal framers of the NCHE's first major activity, the Health Education Role Delineation Project (1978–1981).

Following the School Health Education Study, she joined the faculty of Southern Illinois University at Carbondale (SIUC), where she was Professor in both the Department of Health Education and the School of Medicine, and team taught courses with David Duncan, Robert Gold, and Elaine Vitello. She continued to teach at SIUC until her retirement in 1993. She died in Norman, Oklahoma on March 3, 2008.

References

Notes

Other

Eberst, R. M. (1998). An interview with Dr. Peter Cortese. The International Electronic Journal of Health Education, 1(2), 112–134.
Goldsmith, M. D. (1998). An Interview with Robert Russell. The International Electronic Journal of Health Education, 1: 60-71
Means, R.K. (1975). Historical Perspectives on School Health. Thorofare, N.J.: Charles B. Slack.
Russell, R. D. (1966). Teaching for meaning in health education: The concept approach. Journal of School Health, 36(1), 12–15.
Sliepcevich, E. M. (1964). School Health Education Study: A Summary Report. Washington, D.C.: School Health Education Study.
Sliepcevich EM. (1968). The school health education study: A foundation for community health education. Journal of School Health, 38(1), 45–50.
Sliepcevich EM. (2001). School health education: Appraisal of a conceptual approach to curriculum development. Journal of School Health, 71(8):417-21.

2008 deaths
University of Idaho alumni
University of Michigan alumni
Ohio State University faculty
American social scientists
American health educators
People from Norman, Oklahoma
1919 births